Milcho Manchevski is a New York-based Macedonian film director, photographer and artist.

Work 
Milcho Manchevski's acclaimed Before the Rain is considered "one of the greatest debut feature films in the history of cinema" (Annette Insdorf) and "one of the most important films of the decade" (Ann Kibbey). The New York Times included it in its Guide to the Best 1,000 Films Ever Made list. It won the Golden Lion in Venice, Independent Spirit, was nominated for an Academy Award and won 30 other awards. He has also made the multiple award-winning Dust, Shadows, Mothers, Bikini Moon and Willow, and the shorts The End of Time, Thursday, Macedonia Timeless, Tennessee and 1.73.

Manchevski has authored four exhibitions of photographs, works of fiction, books of essays, and performance art. His work had more than 350 festival screenings (including Venice, Berlin, Toronto, São Paulo, Istanbul, Tokyo, Jerusalem, Hong Kong, Stockholm, Valencia, Sundance, Cinequest, Raindance, Aspen, Jihlava, Mons, Shangai, Beijing, Goa, Bangalore, Sofia, Sarajevo, Thessaloniki, Jerusalem, Hong Kong, Moscow etc.). His films have been distributed in more than 50 countries. His work has been included in the curricula of numerous universities and has been the subject of two academic conferences (in Firenza and Leipzig); he holds an Honorary Doctorate from Moscow's VGIK. He has taught and lectured at the Feirstein Graduate School at Brooklyn College, Tisch School of the Arts at New York University, VGIK in Moscow, EICTV in Cuba, London Film School, University of Texas at Austin, Chicago University, Cambridge University, Cineteca di Bologna, Shanghai University, etc..

Manchevski won best director at the 2020 Raindance Film Festival for Willow.

Filmography

Feature films

Short films 
The End of Time (2017)
Thursday (2013)
Buddies: Race – Skopsko for Us (2015)
Buddies: Filip – Skopsko for Us (2015)
Buddies: Green Car – Skopsko for Us (2015)
Macedonia Timeless: Mountains (2008)
Macedonia Timeless: Temples (2008)
Macedonia Timeless: Archaeology (2008)

Television 
The Wire ("Game Day") (2002)

Music videos 
Kiril Dzajkovski – Red Safari (2019)
Kiril Dzajkovski – Dawn (2019)
Krte Rodzevski – Eh Ljubov (2019)
Nina Spirova – Eden baknez (2007)
Kiril Dzajkovski – Jungle Shadow (2007)
Kiril Dzajkovski – Primitive Science (2001)
Kiril Dzajkovski – The Dead Are Waiting (2001)
Kiril Dzajkovski – Brothel Tango (2001)
Roachford – This Generation (1994)
Arno Hintjens – Vive ma liberte (1993)
George Lamond – Baby I believe in You (1992)
Sonia Dada – You Ain't Thinking (About Me) (1992)
School of Hard Knocks – A Dirty Cop Named Harry (1992)
Arrested Development – Tennessee (1991)
Riff – If You're Serious (1991)
Deskee – Kid Get Hyped (1991)
Partners in Kryme – Undercover (1990)
Bastion – Hot Day in Mexico (1985)
Leb i sol – Aber dojde, Donke (1983)

Art exhibitions 
“There“, 2020

"Dreaming a Wu Yan Poem", 2017]

"Five Drops of Dream" (exhibition of photographic pentaptychs) 2010

"Street", 1999

"The Manifesto of Conceptualists"

"Faces"

"1am"

"How to Explain to a Live Rabbit the Joseph Beuys’ Work How to Explain Pictures to a Dead Hare"

"Riddle"

"1.74"

"The Editing of The Ghost of my Mother"

Thursday 2 (censored by Facebook)

Bibliography 
The Ghost of My Mother, 2000

Truth and Fiction: Notes on (Exceptional) Faith in Art, 2012

Pictures, Words, and Lies, 2015

"Fiction"

"Screenplays"

"Essays"

"Translations"

References

External links 

 
 
 Vimeo Manchevski
 In Conversation: Macedonian Mythmaking: Milcho Manchevski with Conor McGrady & Dario Šolman, The Brooklyn Rail An interview
 Official Youtube Channel
 Instagram, Manchevski
 The New York Times Guide to the Best 1000 Movies Ever Made
 Facebook, Manchevski
 Essays on Before the Rain
 Essays on Dust
 Essays on Shadows
 Essays on Willow
 Essays on Street
 Essays on Five Drops of Dream
 Reviews on IMDb
 Aporias of the war story
 Balkan Homecoming "Before the Rain" and "The Quick and the Dead" by Anthony Lane
 Before the Rain – Stunning Tale Of Macedonia
  "Before the Rain" never ending story by Ian Christie
 "Biography" [by Iris Kronauer] in "Monograph MANCHEVSKI" [Ed. Marina Kostova] (2015)
 "CLOSE UP: Milcho Manchevsky" – a conversation with Nancy Keefe Rhodes in DOSSIER (2005)
 "Compelling 'Mothers' Mixes Truth And Fiction"- Article in Arab Times (2011)
 "Director Makes Dazzling Debut in Rain" – Article in Miami Herald [Rene Rodriguez] (1995)
 "Film Review: Shadows" in Spirituality & Practice [Frederic and Mary Ann Brussat] (2009)
 "Living/Reliving Before the Rain" – Essay -Thomas Woodard
 "Montage and the Semiotics of Credibility: An Analysis of Before the Rain" – Ann Kibbey
 "Mothers" – Article in Eye Weekly [Chris Bilton] (2010)
 "Odgovornost je kljucno pitanje" – Interview for Slobodna Dalmacija [Vesna Lausic] (2008)
 "On Milcho Manchevski's Mothers" – Article in Script [Andrew Horton] (2011)
 "SJENE: U carstvu (sestog) cula" – Article in Slobodna Dalmacija [Marko Njegic] (2008)
 "Sex, Death, Eroticism And Psychological Horror..."-Article in Popcorn Reel [Omar P.L. Moore] (2009)
 "Sexuality and Melancholy" [Katerina Kolozova]
 "The 'Rain' Maker" – Article in Variety [Max Alexander]
 "The 'Rain' maker" – Interview [Roger Ebert] (1995) (rogerebert.com)
 "The Worst Can Happen, And It Does" – Film Review in The New York Times [Janet Maslin] (1995)
 'Willow' Review – Cineuropa
 'Willow' Review – Variety
 'Willow': Film Review – The Hollywood Reporter
 A high-class surreal western – Stopklatka (In Polish)
 Article in IndieWire [Meredith Brody] (2010)
 AsburyMovies.it (In Italian)
 Before the Rain review by Roger Ebert
 Before the Rain review, Washington Post
 Cine Clandestino (In Italian)
 CineFile.biz [Alberto Cassani] (Italian)
 Cinema Without Borders
 Cinematographe (In Italian)
 Cleveland.com
 Criterion Collection film essay [Ian Christie]
 Cubist of the silver screen – The Globe and Mail
 Democrat and Chronicle
 Feral Tribune (In Croatian)
 FilmoviPreporuke.com (In Serbian)
 Frankfurter Rundschau (In German)
 Goodtalking (Nada Vukovic) (In Croatian)
 Hollywood Today (Michelle Foody)
 Los Angeles Times
 Moving Pictures Magazine
 On unhappy endings, politics and storytelling – P.O.V.
 Once Upon a Time in Macedonia – TV Guide Online
 Paying the price of motherhood in flash, blood and grief, by Katerina Kolozova
 Roger Ebert's Video Companion – Article: "Before the Rain" (1997)
 Script
 Slant Magazine [Andrew Schenker]
 Stylus Magazine
 The Movie Gourmet
 The Popcorn Reel
 The Village Voice [Aaron Hillis]
 Variety
 jbspins.blogspot.com

1959 births
Living people
Macedonian film directors
Macedonian screenwriters
Film people from Skopje
Ss. Cyril and Methodius University of Skopje alumni
Tisch School of the Arts faculty
Artists from Skopje
Articles containing video clips
Directors of Golden Lion winners